Jeremi Ray Johnson (born September 4, 1980) is a former American football fullback. He was drafted by the Bengals in the fourth round of the 2003 NFL Draft. He played college football at Indiana University and Western Kentucky.

Early years
Johnson was a standout for Ballard High School, rushing for over 2,000 yards and scoring 35 touchdowns in his junior and senior seasons.

College career

Indiana
As a collegiate player, Jeremi Johnson played his first three seasons at Indiana University, where he was named to the All-Big Ten Conference freshman team in 1999.  However, in 2002, Johnson suffered a hamstring injury in spring practice.

Western Kentucky
Jeremi Johnson transferred to Western Kentucky University for his senior season, where he was a key player on the Hilltoppers' NCAA Division I-AA championship team.

Professional career

Cincinnati Bengals
Johnson was selected by the Cincinnati Bengals in the fourth round (118th overall) of the 2003 NFL Draft. He was released with an injury settlement on November 26, 2008.

The Bengals re-signed Johnson on April 24, 2009. Johnson became a free agent. He has not signed with another team since.

References

External links
Cincinnati Bengals bio

1980 births
Living people
Ballard High School (Louisville, Kentucky) alumni
Players of American football from Louisville, Kentucky
American football fullbacks
Indiana Hoosiers football players
Western Kentucky Hilltoppers football players
Cincinnati Bengals players